Liam Martin (born 5 March 1997) is an Australian professional rugby league footballer who plays as a  forward and  for the Penrith Panthers in the National Rugby League and Australia at international level.

He won both the 2021 and the 2022 NRL Grand Finals with the Panthers. He has represented the NSW Blues in State of Origin.

Early life
Martin was born in Temora, New South Wales, Australia. He was educated at West Wyalong High School. He is a cousin of former NRL footballer Trent Barrett.  He played junior rugby league for the Temora Dragons.

Playing career

2019
In Round 3 of the 2019 NRL season, Martin made his NRL debut for Penrith against the Melbourne Storm.  Martin scored his first try in the top grade in Round 10 against the New Zealand Warriors which ended in a 30–10 defeat at Penrith Park.
Martin made a total of 16 appearances for Penrith in the 2019 NRL season as the club finished 10th on the table and missed out on the finals for the first time since 2015.

2020
Martin played 21 games for Penrith in the 2020 NRL season as the club won the Minor Premiership and reached the 2020 NRL Grand Final.  Martin played in the grand final which Penrith lost 26–20 against Melbourne.

2021
On 30 May 2021, Martin was selected by New South Wales for game one of the 2021 State of Origin series. Martin made his New South Wales debut from the bench in game one of the series as New South Wales defeated Queensland 50–6.  Martin played in all three games of the series which New South Wales won 2–1.

Martin played a total of 27 games for Penrith in the 2021 NRL season including the club's 2021 NRL Grand Final victory over South Sydney.

2022
On 29 May 2022, Martin was selected by New South Wales to play in game one of the 2022 State of Origin series.

In round 23 of the 2022 NRL season, Martin scored the winning try which sealed Penrith's second consecutive Minor Premiership in the clubs 26-22 victory over South Sydney.

Martin played 22 games for Penrith in the 2022 NRL season including the clubs 2022 NRL Grand Final victory over Parramatta.

In October he was named in the Australia squad for the 2021 Rugby League World Cup.

Martin played for Australia in their 2021 Rugby League World Cup final victory over Samoa. Martin scored a try during the first half of the game.

In November he was named in the 2021 RLWC Team of the Tournament.

References

External links

Penrith Panthers profile

1997 births
Living people
Australia national rugby league team players
Australian rugby league players
Rugby league locks
Penrith Panthers players
New South Wales Rugby League State of Origin players
Rugby league players from Temora, New South Wales